Terry Milera is a former professional Australian rules footballer who played for the St Kilda Football Club in the Australian Football League from 2012 to 2014.

Playing career
Milera signed a two-year contract with St Kilda. He made his debut in Round 1 of the 2012 home and away season against .

Milera was delisted at the conclusion of the 2014 AFL season.

Milera later played for Glenelg Football Club in the South Australian National Football League from 2015 to 2018.

Personal life

References

External links

1988 births
Living people
St Kilda Football Club players
Australian rules footballers from South Australia
Indigenous Australian players of Australian rules football
Sandringham Football Club players
People from Ceduna, South Australia
Palmerston Football Club players
Glenelg Football Club players
Port Adelaide Football Club (SANFL) players
Port Adelaide Football Club players (all competitions)